Christopher "Chris" O'Shea is an English actor best known for his debut role in the 2016 feature film Patriots Day, his role as Jareth Glover on the television series Madam Secretary, and his part as Professor Philip Farlow in the television sitcom Baby Daddy.

Career
O'Shea was an extra in the 2002 movie Harry Potter and the Chamber of Secrets and the 2007 film Harry Potter and the Order of the Phoenix.

In 2009, he appeared in the short film, Dead Hungry, which was his first credited acting job. In 2014, he got a part in the ABC Family (later Freeform) sitcom Baby Daddy, which was his first television role. In 2016, he was cast in the CBS drama Madam Secretary as Jareth Glover, Stevie's fiancé from England. Jareth gave up a fellowship at Oxford to return to America to be with Stevie after she had trouble adjusting to life in England. His family is a member of the upper class and even nobility in England. Stevie and Jareth broke up in season 4.

Later in 2016, he joined the cast of the Boston Marathon bombing film Patriots Day. Also in 2016, he was cast in the film Alaska is a Drag.

In 2017 O'Shea starred in A Simple Wedding, alongside Shoreh Aghdashlo, Rita Wilson, Maz Jobrani, Tara Grammy, Houshang Touzie, Peter Mackenzie, Rebecca Henderson, Aleque Reid, Angela Gibbs and James Eckhouse. The film is a romantic comedy in which O'Shea plays a Californian artist who falls in love with a second generation Persian girl (Grammy) and must bridge the cultural divide with her conservative family.

In 2018, O'Shea won a supporting role in the independent film A Modern Persuasion, which is a modern adaptation of Jane Austen's book.

From October 2018 to January 2019, O'Shea played the role of Spike in Tom Stoppard's The Hard Problem at Lincoln Center.

In November 2020, O'Shea was cast in a recurring role on the third season of the Netflix psychological thriller series You.

Filmography

Film

Television

References

External links 

 Instagram account

1992 births
Living people
American male film actors
American male television actors
21st-century American male actors